T. V. Chandrashekarappa (born at Nalkudure, Shimoga district, Karnataka, April 2, 1934 ) was member of 5th Lok Sabha from Shimoga (Lok Sabha constituency) in Karnataka State, India.

He was elected to 7th Lok Sabha from Davangere (Lok Sabha constituency) and 8th and 9th Lok Sabha from Shimoga.

Death
Shri Chandrashekarappa passed away on 18 November 1991 at Banglore at the age of 57.

References

1934 births
People from Shimoga district
India MPs 1971–1977
India MPs 1984–1989
India MPs 1989–1991
People from Davanagere district
India MPs 1980–1984
Karnataka politicians
Lok Sabha members from Karnataka
Living people
Indian National Congress politicians from Karnataka